South Lake, Antigonish  is a lake of Antigonish County, in the north of Nova Scotia, Canada. Its outflow is direct into the ocean waters separating the mainland from Cape Breton Island.

See also
List of lakes in Nova Scotia

References
 National Resources Canada

Lakes of Nova Scotia